Sushi domain is an evolutionarily conserved protein domain. It is also known as Complement control protein (CCP) modules or short consensus repeats (SCR). The name derives from the visual similarity of the domain to nigiri sushi when the primary structure is drawn showing the loops created by the disulfide bonds.

Sushi domains exist in a wide variety of complement and adhesion proteins. The structure is known for this domain; it is based on a beta-sandwich arrangement - one face made up of three β-strands hydrogen-bonded to form a triple-stranded region at its centre, and the other face formed from two separate β-strands.

CD21 (also called C3d receptor, CR2, Epstein Barr virus receptor or EBV-R) is the receptor for EBV and for C3d, C3dg and iC3b. Complement components may activate B cells through CD21. CD21 is part of a large signal-transduction complex that also involves CD19, CD81, and Leu13.

Some of the proteins in this group are responsible for the molecular basis of the blood group antigens, surface markers on the outside of the red blood cell membrane. Most of these markers are proteins, but some are carbohydrates attached to lipids or proteins. Complement decay-accelerating factor (Antigen CD55) belongs to the Cromer blood group system and is associated with Cr(a), Dr(a), Es(a), Tc(a/b/c), Wd(a), WES(a/b), IFC and UMC antigens. Complement receptor type 1 (C3b/C4b receptor) (Antigen CD35) belongs to the Knops blood group system and is associated with Kn(a/b), McC(a), Sl(a) and Yk(a) antigens.

Subfamilies
Selectins 
 CD62E
 CD62L
 CD62P

Examples 

Human genes encoding proteins containing this domain include:
 AGC1, APOH,
 BCAN, BF,
 C1R, C1S, C2, C4BPA, C4BPB, C6, C7, CD46, CD55, CFB, CFH, CFHR1, CFHR2, CFHR3, CFHR4, CFHR5, CR1, CR1L, CR2, CSMD1, CSMD2, CSMD3, CSPG3,
 DAF,
 F13B, FHR4, GABBR1,
 HP,
 IL2RA,
 KIAA0247,
 MASP1, MASP2,
 PAPPA, PAPPA2,  psk-3,
 RAMP,
 SEL-OB, SELE, SELL, SELP, SEZ6, SEZ6L, SEZ6L2, SNED1, SRPX, SRPX2, SUSD1, SUSD2, SUSD4, SVEP1, SEZ6L2,
 TAOK1, TPO, VCAN

References

Protein domains
Single-pass transmembrane proteins